Javier Humet Gaminde (born 20 January 1990) is a Spanish-born Romanian handball player who plays for Dinamo București and the Romania national team.

International honours
 EHF Cup Winners' Cup:
Semifinalist: 2011, 2012

Personal life
In April 2017, Humet acquired Romanian citizenship and will be eligible to play officially for Romania.

References

External links
 Profile at Eurohandball 

1990 births
Living people
Sportspeople from Barcelona
Romanian male handball players
Spanish male handball players
Liga ASOBAL players
SDC San Antonio players
HC Dobrogea Sud Constanța players
Expatriate handball players
Spanish emigrants to Romania
Spanish expatriate sportspeople in France
Naturalised citizens of Romania